Kafr Oweid  is a Syrian village located in Kafr Nabl Nahiyah in Maarrat al-Nu'man District, Idlib.  According to the Syria Central Bureau of Statistics (CBS), Kafr Oweid had a population of 6932 in the 2004 census.

See also 

 December 2011 Jabal al-Zawiya massacres

References 

Populated places in Maarat al-Numan District